Vortex is a stand-up roller coaster located at Carowinds amusement park in Charlotte, North Carolina. Manufactured by Bolliger & Mabillard (B&M), the ride opened to the public on March 14, 1992. Vortex was built a year before Paramount Parks purchased Carowinds and is situated on the former site of the Carolina Speedway miniature car attraction. It was B&M's third coaster and features a loop and a corkscrew element in its relatively short track layout. Vortex represented a new era of stand-up coasters at the time, which were more advanced than the previous generation introduced in the 1980s.

History
On August 15, 1991, Carowinds announced that a new stand-up roller coaster would be added to the park in 1992 called Vortex. It was the first coaster built at Carowinds since Carolina Cyclone in 1980, and also became the park's most expensive ride to date at $5.5 million. Built by Bolliger & Mabillard, Vortex was the sixth stand-up coaster to open in the United States. Construction began in September 1991, and officials believed it would be completed by January 1992.

Vortex officially opened on March 14, 1992. It was repainted for the 2011 season with red track and gray supports, similar to the park's Intimidator coaster.

Ride Layout
Riders depart from the station in a standing position, then ascend a small  lift. A pre-drop, characteristic of early Bolliger & Mabillard coasters, follows the lift hill, preceding the curved right drop. A vertical loop follows the drop and is followed-up by an upward right and downward banked turn. An upward helix follows the downward turn and is followed by a corkscrew to the right. After another upward helix and a wide turnaround, the train enters the final brake run before entering the station.

Construction Data
 109 columns and foundations
 411,000 pounds of steel
 931 cubic yards of concrete

Ride Elements
 Loop
 Corkscrew
 Banked Turn

References

External links

 Official Page

Steel roller coasters
Roller coasters manufactured by Bolliger & Mabillard
Roller coasters in North Carolina
Roller coasters in South Carolina
Roller coasters operated by Cedar Fair
Roller coasters introduced in 1992
Carowinds
Stand-up roller coasters manufactured by Bolliger & Mabillard